Surtees may refer to:

People
Surti Muslims
Surtees (surname), an English surname

Places
Surtees Bridge, a road bridge across the River Tees in Stockton-on-Tees

Others
Surtees, a former motor racing team
Surtees Society, County Durham antiquarian society